Hilger is an unincorporated community and census-designated place in Fergus County, Montana, United States. The community is located along U.S. Highway 191 in central Fergus County. Hilger has a post office with the ZIP code 59451. It is 15 miles north of Lewistown.

Demographics

History
A post office has been in operation in Hilger since 1911. The community was named for settler and historian David J. Hilger.

In 1911 the Chicago, Milwaukee, St. Paul and Pacific Railroad, known as the Milwaukee Road, was built in Hilger.

References

External links
 
Hilger – Russell Country Montana

Unincorporated communities in Fergus County, Montana
Unincorporated communities in Montana